Conrad Bartlette (born 26 August 1959) is a Nevisian cricketer. He played in three first-class and two List A matches for the Leeward Islands in 1984/85.

See also
 List of Leeward Islands first-class cricketers

References

External links
 

1959 births
Living people
Nevisian cricketers
Leeward Islands cricketers